Deliatyn, is an urban-type settlement in Nadvirna Raion (district) of Ivano-Frankivsk Oblast (region) of Ukraine. Together with Yaremche and Lanchyn it is part of a small agglomeration that runs along the Prut River valley between the Carpathian Mountains. Deliatyn hosts the administration of Deliatyn settlement hromada, one of the hromadas of Ukraine.

Deliatyn is first mentioned in documents on March 9, 1400. In 1554 Deliatyn received the status of a city, and from 1579 the status of a city with Magdeburg rights. The economic basis for the development of Deliatyn was the extraction of salt and salt production. 

From December 30, 1962, it was part of the Bohorodchany Raion, but Deliatyn was assigned to the Nadvirna Raion. On August 17, 2017, it became the center of the Deliatyn settlement hromada.

Name
The name of the town had different forms over the centuries: Daliatyn (1400—1440), Deliatyn (1440—1960, 1990), Diliatyn (1961— October 2, 1989). It is believed that the name comes from the names of the legendary founders of the town: Dalia (or Dylia) and Tyna. The Latin word "delatum" meant the place where products were brought to the auction.

History 

Deliatyn became part of Poland (together with Red Ruthenia) in the 15th century. In 1772, it was seized by the Austro-Hungarian Empire together with the province of Galicia (see: Partitions of Poland). After World War I, the town was in the Second Polish Republic, in the Stanisławów Voivodeship. Located in the picturesque area, it was a popular spa, with around 1000 visitors yearly (in the late 1920s). Delatyn was captured by the Red Army in 1939 (see: Polish September Campaign).

After World War II, it was in the USSR; today it is in Ukraine. During the Soviet times, Deliatyn was famous by the Kovpak's Oak, which symbolizes the uncompromised hatred of Ukrainians towards Nazi Germany.

From December 30, 1962, it was part of the Bohorodchany Raion, but Deliatyn was assigned to the Nadvirna Raion. 

Delatyn was home to a Jewish community until autumn 1941.  German archives record mass executions of Jews in the town, carried out by an Einsatzgruppen. On 16 October 1941, the SS, accompanied by the Ukrainian militia and Hungarian Border Guards units shot 1,950 Jews in a forest. [Lemberg Mosaic, Jakob Weiss, Alderbrook Press (2010)] Later, around 200 Jews were killed in the cemetery. During spring 1942, 3,000 Jews were shot. The remaining 2,000 Jews were deported from Deliatyn to the Bełżec extermination camp at the end of 1942. According to the archives, there was no ghetto in Deliatyn, although according to a witness there was one in the center, surrounded with a fence.

Independent Ukraine 

Russo-Ukrainian War 
On 19 March 2022 during the 2022 Russian invasion of Ukraine, Russian Armed Forces  the Kinzhal hypersonic missiles for the first time in world combat history to target a military storage site in Deliatyn.

On April 28, 2022, the executive committee of the Deliatyn settlement council, as part of derussification and decommunization in Ukraine, decided to dismantle monuments-busts and memorial signs on the territory of the hromada, including a bust of the Russian poet Alexander Pushkin on the territory of Deliatyn Lyceum No. 3 and a memorial plaque to Soviet soldiers.

Documentary film 
The 1992 documentary film Return to My Shtetl Delatyn depicts filmmaker Willy Lindwer's travels with his father Berl Nuchim and his daughter Michal to Delatyn to "retrace the route his father had taken six decades earlier, escaping from the Nazis and to see how the area and its inhabitants had changed."

Delatynite  
Delatynite is a variety of amber found in Deliatyn.

References

Notes

Sources
 Website of the Nadvirna district council

 
Populated places on the Prut
Stanisławów Voivodeship
Urban-type settlements in Nadvirna Raion
Shtetls
Holocaust locations in Ukraine
Nadvirna Raion